Willy Hamacher (10 July 1865, Breslau - 9 July 1909, Bad Reinerz) was a German landscape and marine painter.

Life and work 
His father, who died four months before he was born, was a painter; as was his older brother, .

From 1888 to 1889, he continued his studies at the Kunstakademie Düsseldorf with  Eugen Dücker. From 1889, he was a member of the progressive artists' association, Malkasten.

Later, from 1890 to 1894, he was able to perfect his techniques in Berlin, at the Prussian Academy of Arts, where he studied with Hans Gude, who had been Schirm's teacher. During that time, he opened his own studio near the Tiergarten. In 1895 he moved to the Tauentzienstraße, where he operated a painting school "for men and women". After 1904, he lived and worked in Wilmersdorf.

He travelled extensively; to Sweden, France, England and Italy. He initially favored Nordic coastal landscapes, but later came to prefer the brighter scenery of Italy. His major exhibitions included those at the  Glaspalast (1888), the Große Berliner Kunstausstellung (from 1889), where he was awarded a small gold medal in 1896, and with the Berlin Secession (1898).

References

Further reading 
 "Hamacher, Willy", In: Allgemeines Lexikon der Bildenden Künstler von der Antike bis zur Gegenwart, Vol. 15: Gresse–Hanselmann, E. A. Seemann, Leipzig 1922 (Online)
 Helmut Börsch-Supan, Hans Paffrath (Eds.): Lexikon der Düsseldorfer Malerschule, Vol.2: Haach–Murtfeldt. Bruckmann, Munich 1998,

External links 

 More works by Hamacher @ ArtNet

1865 births
1909 deaths
19th-century German painters
19th-century German male artists
German landscape painters
German marine artists
Kunstakademie Düsseldorf alumni
Prussian Academy of Arts alumni
People from Wrocław
20th-century German painters
20th-century German male artists